Aeronautica Bonomi was an Italian aircraft manufacturer.

Aircraft manufactured by Bonomi include:

Gliders
 Bonomi BS.2 Balestruccio
 Bonomi BS.4 Basettino
 Bonomi BS.5 Ballerina
 Bonomi BS.6 Bigiarella
 Bonomi BS.7 Allievo Italia
 Bonomi BS.8 Biancone
 Bonomi BS.9 Bertina
 Bonomi BS.10 Ardea
 Bonomi BS.11 Milano
 Bonomi BS.12 Roma
 Bonomi BS.14 Astore
 Bonomi BS.15 Bigiarella
 Bonomi BS.16 Allievo Bonomi
 Bonomi BS.17 Allievo Cantù
 Bonomi BS.18 Airone
 Bonomi BS.20 Albanella
 Bonomi BS.24 Biposto Roma
 Bonomi BS.28 Alcione
 Bonomi BS.28 Aerodinamico

Powered aircraft
 Bonomi BS.19 Alca
 Bonomi BS.22 Alzavola

Defunct aircraft manufacturers of Italy
1930s Italian sailplanes